Bianca Isabel Pagdanganan (born 28 October 1997) is a Filipino professional golfer. As an amateur, she was a dual medalist in the 2018 Asian Games, winning a bronze in the women's individual event, and a gold medal in the team event with Yuka Saso and Lois Kaye Go.

Early life and education
A native of Quezon City, Pagdanganan was born on 28 October 1997 to Sam and Bing Pagdanganan and has two siblings. She attended the Assumption Antipolo High School graduating from the institution in 2015. In 2015, Pagdanganan entered the Gonzaga University in the United States to pursue a major degree in sports management. After two years at Gonzaga, Pagdanganan transferred to the University of Arizona.

Amateur career
Pagdanganan was influenced by her father to take up golf. Her father would bring her along his golf sessions during the weekends.

Collegiate
From 2015 to 2017, Pagdanganan played for the golf team of Gonzaga University. She later represented the University of Arizona and helped the Arizona Wildcats clinch the 2018 NCAA Division I Women's Golf Championships. Her teammates dubbed her as "The Unicorn" for her skills in golf, particularly her long-driving ability. She intends to pursue a professional career in golf after graduating from university.

National
Prior to moving to the United States, Pagdanganan has competed in national youth tournaments in the Philippines. She won the 2014 Philippine Junior Amateur Open, was a low medalist in the stroke play portion of the 2013 Philippine Amateur Open, and won the 2013 Philippine Ladies Open. She also placed second in the 2012 PHILEX Northern Luzon Regional Amateur Golf Championship and 2013 Philippine Amateur Championship.

International
Internationally, Pagdanganan competes for the Philippines. In the 2018 Asian Games, she clinched a bronze medal in the women's event and a gold medal in the team event with Yuka Saso and Lois Kaye Go. At the 2019 Southeast Asian Games, she won individual and team gold medals.

Professional career
Pagdanganan turned professional in January 2020. She earned her LPGA Tour card through the LPGA Q-Series in November 2019.

Amateur wins
2014 Philippine Junior Amateur Open
2017 Philippine Ladies Open, Branch Law Firm-Dick McGuire
2018 Santi Cup
2019 Hawkeye El Tigre Invitational, Southeast Asian Games (gold medal)

Source:

References

External links

Filipino female golfers
LPGA Tour golfers
Olympic golfers of the Philippines
Golfers at the 2020 Summer Olympics
Gonzaga Bulldogs women's golfers
Arizona Wildcats women's golfers
Asian Games gold medalists for the Philippines
Asian Games bronze medalists for the Philippines
Asian Games medalists in golf
Golfers at the 2018 Asian Games
Medalists at the 2018 Asian Games
Southeast Asian Games gold medalists for the Philippines
Southeast Asian Games medalists in golf
Competitors at the 2019 Southeast Asian Games
Filipino expatriates in the United States
Sportspeople from Quezon City
1997 births
Living people